Ōhaeawai is a small village at the junction of State Highway 1 and State Highway 12 in the Far North District of New Zealand, some  from Auckland.

The New Zealand Ministry for Culture and Heritage gives a translation of "place of thermal waters" for Ōhaeawai.

History
Nearby is the site of the bloody Battle of Ohaeawai fought at Pene Taui's pā (fort) during the Flagstaff War in 1845. The therapeutic mercurial waters of the minor health spa of Ngawha Springs are in a small thermal area to the west, where Northland prison is situated. The village is the centre of a rich farming district as a result of the fertile volcanic soils, with the district known to the Ngāpuhi as Tai-a-mai.

Taiamai was the name given to a large boulder of volcanic rock situated about 400 m (quarter mile) south east of the Ohaeawai Hotel.

In 1845 Te Ruki Kawiti and Pene Taui fortified Taui's pā (fort), which British forces laid siege to in July that year. The outcome of the Battle of Ohaeawai is considered to be a defeat of the British colonial forces. St. Michael's Anglican Church was built in 1870 on the site of the pā.

In August 2018 the battleground area around the church, including the urupa (cemetery), was added to the Heritage New Zealand list as a wāhi tapu, a place sacred to the Ngāti Rangi Hapu and of historic significance.

The locality is usually called Ngawha, from the hot springs in the neighbourhood. Cowan (1922) asserts that the site of the church (and earlier pā) is the true Ohaeawai and the European township which has appropriated the name should properly be known as Taiamai.

In June 2019, the name of the locality was officially gazetted as Ōhaeawai by the New Zealand Geographic Board.

Demographics
Statistics New Zealand describes Ōhaeawai as a rural settlement. The settlement is part of the larger Ōhaeawai-Waimate North statistical area.

Ōhaeawai had a population of 399 at the 2018 New Zealand census, an increase of 60 people (17.7%) since the 2013 census, and an increase of 57 people (16.7%) since the 2006 census. There were 138 households, comprising 189 males and 207 females, giving a sex ratio of 0.91 males per female, with 96 people (24.1%) aged under 15 years, 75 (18.8%) aged 15 to 29, 159 (39.8%) aged 30 to 64, and 66 (16.5%) aged 65 or older.

Ethnicities were 63.2% European/Pākehā, 51.9% Māori, 6.8% Pacific peoples, 0.8% Asian, and 2.3% other ethnicities. People may identify with more than one ethnicity.

Although some people chose not to answer the census's question about religious affiliation, 48.1% had no religion, 42.1% were Christian and 4.5% had Māori religious beliefs.

Of those at least 15 years old, 30 (9.9%) people had a bachelor's or higher degree, and 69 (22.8%) people had no formal qualifications. 18 people (5.9%) earned over $70,000 compared to 17.2% nationally. The employment status of those at least 15 was that 147 (48.5%) people were employed full-time, 36 (11.9%) were part-time, and 15 (5.0%) were unemployed.

Ōhaeawai-Waimate North statistical area

Ohaeawai-Waimate North had a population of 1,140 at the 2018 New Zealand census, an increase of 207 people (22.2%) since the 2013 census, and an increase of 276 people (31.9%) since the 2006 census. There were 408 households, comprising 561 males and 579 females, giving a sex ratio of 0.97 males per female. The median age was 44.5 years (compared with 37.4 years nationally), with 231 people (20.3%) aged under 15 years, 183 (16.1%) aged 15 to 29, 501 (43.9%) aged 30 to 64, and 225 (19.7%) aged 65 or older.

Ethnicities were 71.8% European/Pākehā, 42.1% Māori, 2.9% Pacific peoples, 1.3% Asian, and 1.6% other ethnicities. People may identify with more than one ethnicity.

The percentage of people born overseas was 12.9, compared with 27.1% nationally.

Although some people chose not to answer the census's question about religious affiliation, 51.8% had no religion, 36.3% were Christian, 5.3% had Māori religious beliefs, 0.3% were Buddhist and 0.5% had other religions.

Of those at least 15 years old, 141 (15.5%) people had a bachelor's or higher degree, and 186 (20.5%) people had no formal qualifications. The median income was $26,900, compared with $31,800 nationally. 99 people (10.9%) earned over $70,000 compared to 17.2% nationally. The employment status of those at least 15 was that 441 (48.5%) people were employed full-time, 144 (15.8%) were part-time, and 45 (5.0%) were unemployed.

Marae

There are three Ngāpuhi marae in the Ōhaeawai area. Parawhenua Marae is affiliated with the hapū of Ngāti Hineira, Ngāti Korohue, Te Uri Taniwha and Te Whanauwhero. Rāwhitiroa or Te Ahuahu Marae is affiliated with Ngāti Hineira, Te Kapotai, Te Popoto, Te Uri Taniwha and Ngawha Marae affiliated with Ngati Rangi.

In October 2020, the Government committed $499,093 from the Provincial Growth Fund to upgrade the Parawhenua Marae, creating 10 jobs.

Education
Ohaeawai School is a coeducational contributing primary (years 1-6) school with a roll of  students as of  The school's history extends to 1874.

Notes

External links
 Ohaeawai School website

Far North District
Populated places in the Northland Region